Abraxas triseriaria is a species of moth belonging to the family Geometridae. It was described by Gottlieb August Wilhelm Herrich-Schäffer in 1855. It is known from Myanmar, Sumatra and Java.

References

Abraxini
Moths of Asia
Moths described in 1855